1960 Speedway World Team Cup was the first edition of the FIM Speedway World Team Cup to determine the team world champions. The final took place in Gothenburg, Sweden. The World Champion title was won by Sweden team (44 pts) who beat England (30 pts), Czechoslovakia (15 pts) and Poland (7 pts).

Sweden's reigning World Champion Ove Fundin went through the entire World Team Cup undefeated.  This feat would not be matched until Australia's Jason Crump went through the 2001 Speedway World Cup undefeated. To honour Fundin's deeds in 1960, the winners of the current Speedway World Cup (which replaced the Team World Cup in 2001) receive the Ove Fundin Trophy.

Qualification

Scandinavian Round
 9 June
  Odense
 Att: 6,000

* Sweden to Final

British Round
 R1: 18 July -  London, Wimbledon Stadium

 R2: 21 July -  Oxford, Oxford Stadium

 R3: 5 August -  Swindon, Abbey Stadium

 R4: 10 August -  Manchester - Hyde Road

* England to Final

Central European Round
 31 July
  Pilzno

* Czechoslovakia to Final

East European Round
Round was canceled. Poland was qualify to the final. East Germany, Hungary and Yugoslavia win draw..

World Final
 2 September 1960
  Göteborg, Ullevi
 Attendance: 11,500

See also
 Motorcycle speedway
 1960 Individual Speedway World Championship

References

1960
World Team
September 1960 sports events in Europe